Freight Tycoon is a simulation strategy computer game focused around transporting goods via small and large tonnage trucks.  The game was published by the Russian 1C Company.

References

External links
Freight Tycoon  on the 1C Company website

2006 video games
1C Company games
Windows games
Windows-only games
Business simulation games
Video games developed in Russia